David John Lowry (born February 14, 1965) is a Canadian ice hockey coach and former professional player. He is currently an associate coach with the Seattle Kraken of the National Hockey League (NHL). He played in the NHL from 1985 to 2004.

Lowry's sons, Adam and Joel, were drafted by the Winnipeg Jets and the Los Angeles Kings, respectively.

Playing career
Born in Sudbury, Ontario and raised in Ottawa, Dave Lowry was drafted by the Vancouver Canucks in the 6th round, 110th overall, in the 1983 NHL Entry Draft. He played three seasons with the London Knights of the Ontario Hockey League (OHL) before joining the Canucks for the start of the 1985–86 NHL season. In Vancouver, he played for three seasons with only spending part of the 1987–88 season in the minors for the Fredericton Express of the American Hockey League (AHL). On 29 September 1988, just prior to the start of the 1988–89 NHL season, Lowry was traded to the St. Louis Blues for Ernie Vargas.

After spending most of the 1988–89 season with the Peoria Rivermen of the International Hockey League (IHL), Lowry joined the Blues for the last 21 games of the season including ten more games in the playoffs. Lowry stayed with St. Louis until the end of the 1992–93 NHL season. Dave Lowry was never much of an offensive threat as his highest goal total was 19, which he did twice, both times with the Blues, and his highest point total was 40, which was also with the Blues. Before he retired, he managed to play over 1000 NHL games.

Dave Lowry was drafted in the expansion draft by the Florida Panthers before the 1993–94 NHL season. Lowry had his best years in Florida. Perhaps he is most famous for being on the runner up team in 1995–96. He would be given the nickname Mr. Playoff as he scored ten goals during the 1996 Stanley Cup Playoffs. After five seasons in Florida, he was traded to the San Jose Sharks near the beginning of the 1997–98 season along with a first round pick in the 1998 NHL Entry Draft (Vincent Lecavalier) for Viktor Kozlov and a fifth round pick (Jaroslav Špaček) also in the 1998 draft.

After only three seasons in San Jose, Lowry went to the Calgary Flames for the 2000–01 season where he played out his last four seasons, with the exception of a brief stint with the Saint John Flames of the AHL. In his last NHL season, he played only 18 games in the regular season acquiring one goal and one assist. In the playoffs, though, he played 10 games in Calgary's improbable Stanley Cup run of 2004 that ended in a loss to the Tampa Bay Lightning.

Coaching career
After retiring as a player, Lowry began coaching, joining the Western Hockey League's Calgary Hitmen as an assistant coach in 2005. Lowry was promoted to associate coach in 2007, and named the head coach of the Hitmen in 2008, succeeding Kelly Kisio. After one season as head coach for the Hitmen, Lowry joined the Calgary Flames in the NHL as an assistant coach beginning in 2009, where he served for three seasons.

On July 19, 2012, Lowry was named the head coach of the Victoria Royals of the WHL.

On May 30, 2017, Lowry was hired as an assistant coach for the Los Angeles Kings of the NHL. After two seasons with the Kings, he returned to the WHL as the head coach of the Brandon Wheat Kings.

On November 23, 2020, Lowry was hired as an assistant coach for the Winnipeg Jets, reuniting him with his son Adam. On December 17, 2021, Lowry was named interim head coach of the Jets after head coach Paul Maurice resigned.

Career statistics

Regular season and playoffs

Head coaching record

NHL

WHL

See also
 List of NHL players with 1,000 games played
 Captain (ice hockey)

References

External links
 
 Dave Lowry at Hockeydraftcentral.com

Note: Lowry was named captain in December 2000, upon the retirement of Steve Smith. He was later stripped of the captaincy in February 2002 (by coach Greg Gilbert, because of poor performance on ice), Craig Conroy and Bob Boughner were named co-captains.

1965 births
Living people
Calgary Flames captains
Calgary Flames coaches
Calgary Flames players
Calgary Hitmen coaches
Canadian ice hockey coaches
Canadian ice hockey left wingers
Florida Panthers players
Fredericton Express players
Ice hockey people from Ottawa
London Knights players
Los Angeles Kings coaches
Peoria Rivermen (IHL) players
Saint John Flames players
St. Louis Blues players
San Jose Sharks players
Seattle Kraken coaches
Sportspeople from Greater Sudbury
Vancouver Canucks draft picks
Vancouver Canucks players
Victoria Royals coaches